Jatinder Shah is an Indian music composer and record producer. He is primarily recognized for his compositions in Punjabi music and film industry. He has also composed for many Hindi films like Second Hand Husband and Dilliwali Zaalim Girlfriend. His works are notable for integrating pop, and Sufi music with modern music sounds, world music genres and traditional music. In August 2015, he performed live at MTV Coke Studio along with Gurdas Maan and Diljit Dosanjh on the song "Ki Banu Duniya Da" which was widely appreciated allover the world.

Music Album

Filmography

References

External links 

Living people
Indian composers
Punjabi music
Bhangra (music) musicians
Year of birth missing (living people)